Ropyr Madison Koe Wetzel (born July 14, 1992) is an American singer and songwriter. His music has been described variously as a "blend of rock and country", outlaw country, and "fusing country and grunge".

Life and career 
Wetzel was born in Pittsburg, Texas, with one of his names being a reference to outlaw country singer-songwriter David Allen Coe. His mother was a touring country singer, bringing the young Koe along and his father worked in construction. He would perform on stage for the first time at age six. Later, Wetzel was a linebacker at Tarleton State University in Stephenville, Texas, where he decided to pursue a career as a musician instead.

Wetzel formed "Koe Wetzel and Konvicts", and self-released an EP and one full-length album. His "rowdy" music and lyrics became popular among college students and young adults, and Noise Complaint, released in 2016, was considered to be his breakout album. Beginning with Noise Complaint, the full name of the band was dropped, though Wetzel still performs with a bassist, one drummer, and two guitarists. The band signed with Red 11 Music in Austin, TX in early 2018 while being managed by 4-Tay Management out of Stephenville, TX until 2019 when the band signed a management deal with Floating Leaf Entertainment, establishing a joint venture between Wetzel and Jeb Hurt who had previously been the band's agent at Red 11 Music.

Harold Saul High was released in 2019 to mixed reviews, however sales were strong, and the album charted on the Billboard 200.

In 2020, Wetzel released Sellout, named in reference to his signing with major label Columbia Records.

Musical style 
Wetzel's music is usually described as fusing genres, especially rock and country while he has been rumored to personally refer to his blend of music as "Hillbilly Punk-Rock". In his youth, Wetzel was exposed to country, hip-hop, rap, and grunge including the music of Nirvana. In an interview for American Songwriter, Wetzel described his album Harold Saul High as "...90s country meets early 2000s punk rock with early ’90s grunge and hip-hop music in the background."

His lyrics often deal with mature subject matter, and are known for containing explicit language. One example is the song "February 28, 2016": a song about drunkenness, and a reference to his arrest for public intoxication in Stephenville on that day.

In 2019, Wetzel's performance at the Great Texas Balloon Race was the subject of some controversy, after some festival goers were offended at his refusal to make his songs more family friendly. Wetzel responded in a tongue in cheek manner, taking credit for breaking attendance records.

Discography

Studio albums

Extended plays

Charted songs

References

External links 

 Koe Wetzel's website

1992 births
Living people
Country musicians from Texas
American rock singers
American rock songwriters
People from Pittsburg, Texas
American country singer-songwriters
Alternative_rock_singers
American_alternative_country_singers
Post-grunge_musicians
Grunge_musicians
American country rock singers
American male singer-songwriters
Singer-songwriters from Texas